Marwan Kenzari (born 16 January 1983) is a Dutch actor born in The Hague, Netherlands. Starting his career in 2008, he first came to prominence for his role in the 2013 film Wolf, which earned him a Golden Calf award for Best Actor. Since 2016, he has been starring in English-language films, including Aladdin (2019), The Old Guard (2020) and Black Adam (2022), which earned him international recognition.

Life and career

Early life and beginnings
Kenzari was born on 16 January 1983 in The Hague, Netherlands, to a Tunisian family. His father was a construction worker, while his mother was a housewife. As a teenager he was mainly interested in football before a girl he was seeing signed them up to audition for the Dutch version of the musical Chicago. In 2009, Kenzari graduated at the Maastricht Academy of Dramatic Arts. After graduation he was recruited by the Toneelgroep Amsterdam, which allowed him to tour in Moscow, London, Vienna and New York City with the group.

Kenzari has acted in films and TV series in his native Dutch since 2008. In 2013, he won a Golden Calf for Best Actor at the Netherlands Film Festival for his role in the feature film Wolf (2013). He trained for over a year to play the role of kickboxer Majid. With his toned body, he was also featured on the cover of Dutch Men's Health in 2013. His performance in the film was well received by critics, with Variety naming him an "International Star You Should Know". In 2014, Kenzari won a Shooting Stars Award at the Berlin International Film Festival.

Rise to prominence
In 2016 he appeared in the English-language films Collide, Ben-Hur and The Promise, which resulted in The Hollywood Reporter naming him amongst their list of "15 International Breakout Talents of 2016". In 2019, Kenzari played villain Jafar in Disney's live-action adaptation of Aladdin. He gained international recognition after portraying the role with mainstream media giving him the nickname "hot Jafar". In July 2020, Kenzari appeared in The Old Guard as one of the film's protagonists. In February 2021, Kenzari was cast to portray Ishmael Gregor / Sabbac in the 2022 film Black Adam.

He starred as the controversial Royal Netherlands East Indies Army (KNIL) officer Raymond Westerling in the 2020 film The East, which was released on Amazon Prime Video.

Personal life
Kenzari speaks Arabic, Dutch, English and French.

Kenzari is engaged to long-time partner Nora Ponse. The couple have one child.

Filmography

Film

Television

Awards and nominations

References

External links

1983 births
Living people
Dutch male actors
Dutch male film actors
Dutch male television actors
Dutch people of Tunisian descent
Golden Calf winners
Male actors from The Hague